The women's 4 × 100 metre freestyle relay event for the 1976 Summer Olympics was held in Montreal.

U.S. victory over East German dopers who received state support from the Soviet Bloc is often considered the greatest upset in swimming history. East Germans swept most of the other medals and even finished first and second in the women's 100m freestyle event while the US didn't win a medal.

Heats

Heat 1

Heat 2

Final

References

External links
scmsom

Swimming at the 1976 Summer Olympics
1976 in women's swimming
Women's events at the 1976 Summer Olympics